Westleigh is a village and civil parish in the North Devon district, in the English County of Devon.

Tapeley Park, a country house, is located within the parish. The village overlooks the Taw and Torridge Estuary.

To the South of Westleigh is the hamlet of Southcott.

References

External links

Parish Council website

Villages in Devon
North Devon